Richard Champernowne (or Champernown, c.1558 Modbury, Devon - 1622) was an MP in Cornwall, representing West Looe constituency. He was elected in the 1586 United Kingdom general election but did not return to Parliament after the next election.

References

1550s births
1620 deaths
Members of the pre-1707 English Parliament for constituencies in Cornwall
People from South Hams (district)
English MPs 1586–1587
Members of the Parliament of England for West Looe